Loddefjord Church is a parish church of the Church of Norway in Bergen Municipality in Vestland county, Norway. It is located in the Loddefjord neighborhood in the city of Bergen. It is the church for the Loddefjord parish which is part of the Bergen domprosti (arch-deanery) in the Diocese of Bjørgvin. The white, stone church was built in a long church design in 1926 using plans drawn up by the architect Ole Landmark. The church seats about 250 people.

History
The new parish of Loddefjord was established in 1915. It wasn't until the mid-1920s, however, when the church was constructed. Land for the church was given by the factory owner, Fasmer. The church was built in 1925-1926 and it was consecrated on 17 December 1926. The church underwent a major renovation in 1956.

Media gallery

See also
List of churches in Bjørgvin

References

Churches in Bergen
Long churches in Norway
Stone churches in Norway
20th-century Church of Norway church buildings
Churches completed in 1926
1926 establishments in Norway